Lluçanès is a natural region transitioning between the Plain of Vic and Berguedà, in the pre-Pyrenees. Although not an officially recognized comarca of Catalonia, it has a strong historical, natural and social personality.

Corresponding municipalities
It is made up of the following municipalities:
 In the comarca of Osona: Alpens, Lluçà, Olost, Oristà, Perafita, Prats de Lluçanès, Sant Agustí de Lluçanès, Sant Bartomeu del Grau, Sant Boi de Lluçanès, Sant Martí d'Albars, Sobremunt.
 In the comarca of Berguedà: Santa Maria de Merlès
 In the comarca of Bages: Sant Feliu Sasserra.

Geography
Lluçanès is a plateau of about 400 km2, situated in the north-east of the depressió central of Catalonia

The major waterways of the comarca include the Ter and Llobregat rivers, into which the Riera de Merlès, Riera de Lluçanès and Gavarresa feed.

Lluçanès has a Mediterranean climate transitioning to continental. It has a median temperature of about 12 degrees Celsius, and receives an annual precipitation of between 600 and 900 liters.

Education
Most villages have their own infant and primary schools.

The high school responsible for the secondary education is Castell del Quer Institute

New comarca proposal

In the "Report on the revision of Catalonia's territorial organisation model" of 2000, known as the Roca Report, commissioned by the Catalan government, it was recommended that Lluçanès should become a sub-comarca of Osona. However, following a local campaign for full comarca status, a non-binding referendum was held in the region in July 2015, in which a majority in each of the municipalities of Alpens, Lluçà, Olost, Oristà, Perafita, Prats del Lluçanès, Sant Martí d'Albars, and Sobremunt, all currently in Osona, voted to join a new full comarca, while the other five municipalities voted to remain in their existing comarcas. Several local and national officials expressed disappointment at the result which excludes regions strongly associated with Lluçanès from the proposed new comarca, and have called for discussions on ways to resolve the issue, including a repeat of the vote.

See also
 Moianès - a neighbouring region which became a new comarca earlier in 2015

References

External links
Consortium of Lluçanès

Comarques of the Province of Barcelona
Natural regions of Spain